Miss Dominican Republic (Spanish: Miss República Dominicana) is a national beauty pageant in the Dominican Republic.

History

Miss Dominican Republic Organization has been in operation since 1927. In 1956, the pageant was officially restarted after crowning models from 1952 until 1955. In 1956, Olga Fiallo from Santiago won, making the Dominican Republic's first representative to Miss Universe. In 1966, the Concurso Nacional de Belleza Dominicana lost its Miss Universe rights for only one year but on that same year it gained their Miss World franchise sending the winner of that year, Jeanette Dotel from San Juan as their first representative. In 1967, the organization officially decided that the Winner would go to Miss Universe, First Runner-up would enter Miss World and Second Runner-up to a Festival of Latin Beauties in South America. The MRD organization had acquired the Miss International rights, but the organization would only send a representative if the budget allowed them. It wasn't until 1980, when they decided that the Second Runner-up would enter either in Miss International, Reinado Nacional del Café or Miss América Latina. In 1989 until 2000, the official Second Runner-up would enter Miss International, the Third Runner-up would enter Reinado Nacional del Café and the Fourth Runner-up would enter Miss América Latina. This has been the same until 2003 when the organization separated into two separate organizations.

Miss República Dominicana Universo Organization
The Miss República Dominicana Universo Organization was created in 2003 by Belkys Reyes, and was taken over by Magali Febles in 2004. Since 2003, the representatives of Dominican Republic for one out of the four major international pageants have been selected by this organization. This organization is in charge of sending representatives to Miss Universe. Miss República Dominicana Universo competes in Miss Universe. Also, this organization has 15 franchises in other international competitions and sends representatives to these competitions every year such as Reina Hispanoamericana and Miss Continentes Unidos.

Reina Nacional de Belleza Dominicana Organization
The organization of Reina Nacional de Belleza Dominicana was created in 2003 by Diany Mota, and is still run by her today. Since 2003, the representatives of Dominican Republic for three out of the four major international pageants have been selected by this organization, until in 2015 when they lost the Miss Earth franchise. This organization is in charge of sending representatives to Miss World and Miss International. Miss Mundo Dominicana competes in Miss World and Miss Internacional Dominicana competes in Miss International.

Provincial Pageants
In 2009, there has been a huge involvement of the organization in regional pageants. There is right now 6 regional pageants.

For the first time, Miss Dominican Republic organization, will have auditions / contests in all the provinces except the province of Santo Domingo, because of its huge population, the 3 metropolitan municipalities have auditions / contests.
The pageants are:

Miss Azua
Miss Bahoruco
Miss Barahona
Miss Dajabón
Miss Distrito Nacional
Miss Duarte
Miss El Seibo
Miss Elías Piña
Miss Espaillat
Miss Guerra-Boca Chica
Miss Hato Mayor
Miss Hermanas Mirabal
Miss Independencia
Miss La Altagracia
Miss La Romana
Miss La Vega
Miss Los Alcarrizos
Miss María Trinidad Sánchez
Miss Monseñor Nouel
Miss Monte Cristi
Miss Monte Plata
Miss Pedernales
Miss Pedro Brand
Miss Peravia
Miss Puerto Plata
Miss Samaná
Miss San Cristóbal
Miss San José de Ocoa
Miss San Juan
Miss San Pedro de Macorís
Miss Sánchez Ramírez
Miss Santiago
Miss Santiago Rodríguez
Miss Santo Domingo Este
Miss Santo Domingo Norte
Miss Santo Domingo Oeste
Miss Valverde
Dominican Communities Abroad
Miss Comunidad Dominicana en Estados Unidos
Miss Comunidad Dominicana en México
Miss Comunidad Dominicana en Puerto Rico
Miss Comunidad Dominicana en Venezuela
Miss Comunidad Dominicana en Italia

Miss República Dominicana Universo

The following is a list of winners. From 2002 to Present.

Province rankings

 *As Old Santo Domingo Province
 ** As Trujillo Province
 *** As San Rafael Province
 **** Won handpicked
 ***** As Salcedo Province
 ****** Crowned as new titleholder

Miss Mundo DominicanaMiss Mundo Dominicana (Miss World Dominican Republic) is a pageant that was made 2003. Since 1956 they crowned Miss Dominican Republic, Miss Dominican World and Reina Nacional de Belleza Miss República Dominicana together. Then they split up in 2003. In 2011, the Miss World Dominican Republic was given to Dominican designer Diany Mota, along with Miss International Dominican Republic. The following is a list of winners. From 2003 to Present.Province rankings

 

 *Was prepared to go to Miss World but had an issues in attending and withdrew before going.
 ** As Salcedo Province

Miss República Dominicana InternacionalReina Nacional de Belleza Miss República Dominicana is a pageant that was made 2003. Since 1962 they crowned Miss Dominican Republic, Miss Dominican World and Reina Nacional de Belleza Miss República Dominicana together. Then they split up in 2003 until 2013. In 1991 Miss Dominican Republic International 1991 Rafaela Suarez didn't wanted to enter in Miss International 1991, so Melissa Vargas took over. In the Miss Dominican Republic pageant 1995 and Miss Dominican Republic 1996, the winners would enter both Miss Universe and Miss International. In 2003, the first winner, Aura Ramos could enter Miss International 2003 due to visa problems at last minute. It had various names during its history. They were Señorita República Dominicana Internacional, Miss RD Internacional and Reina Nacional de Belleza. The following is a list of winners. From 2003 to Present.Province rankings

Miss Tierra República DominicanaThe Dominican Republic Earth, also known as Miss Tierra República Dominicana, used to be crowned together with the Miss Dominican Republic Universe, Miss Dominica World, and Reina Nacional de Belleza Miss República Dominicana from 2001 to 2003. In 2003, the four beauty pageant titles were split until 2013. The Miss Tierra República Dominicana national pageant is held annually. The winner is expected to participate in the international Miss Earth beauty pageant, an annual international beauty pageant promoting environmental awareness. The Miss Earth winner serves as the spokesperson for the Miss Earth Foundation, the United Nations Environment Programme (UNEP) and other environmental organizations. The following is a list of winners. From 2001 to Present.''

 *Cheryl Ortega was originally set to compete at Miss Earth 2014 but withdrew due to her studies. Mayte Brito who was originally set to compete the following year will step in her place.

Province rankings

See also
Mister Dominican Republic
Dominican Republic at major beauty pageants

References

External links
Official site

 
Dominican Republic
1956 establishments in the Dominican Republic
Recurring events established in 1927
Dominican Republic awards